Zaynab Alkali was born into the Tura-Mazila family of Borno and Adamawa States. For secondary education, she attended Queen Elizabeth Secondary School, Ilorin. Zaynab Alkali went on to obtain both her first and second degrees from Ahmadu Bello University (ABU)/BUK, Zaria. At Bayero University Kano (BUK), she studied English to a doctorate level.

Life and education
Alkali was born in Tura-Wazila in Borno State in 1950. She graduated from Bayero University Kano with a BA in 1973.  She obtained a doctorate in African Studies in the same university and became the principal of Shekara Girls' Boarding School. She went on to be a lecturer in English at two universities in Nigeria.

She married the former vice-chancellor of the University of Maiduguri, Mohammed Nur Alkali, and they had six children.

She rose to be a dean in the faculty of arts at Nasarawa State University in Keffi, where she taught creative writing.

She is regarded as the first woman novelist from Northern Nigeria.

Works
The Stillborn, Lagos: Longman (Drumbeats), 1984, 
The Virtuous Woman, Longman Nigeria, 1987, 
Cobwebs & Other Stories, Lagos: Malthouse Press, 1997, .
The Descendants, Tamaza, 2005, 
 The Initiates, 2007, .

Career
She worked in the University of Maiduguri as a senior lecturer in the English department where she worked for twenty years. Later on she left the University of Maiduguri to the National Primary Health Care Development Agency in Abuja, where she worked for three years until she left to work at Nasarawa State University.

The Stillborn, perhaps Zaynab Alkali's best-known work was published to critical acclaim in 1984. This coming-of-age novel depicts the physical and spiritual journey of a Nigerian woman who learns to survive, in the face of harsh traditions. The novel was quickly followed by The Virtuous Woman which was published by Longman, Nigeria in 1987. Like many talented writers of prose, Zaynab Alkali decided to try her hands on short prose form. Cobwebs & Other Stories was published by the famous Malthouse Press in Lagos in 1997. The Descendants was published by Spectrum Lagos 2007 and followed by The Initiates in 2007, and Invisible Borders 2016, Zaynab Alkali's books have been translated into many languages such as German, French, Arabic and Spanish. To date, Zaynab Alkali has won over 40 awards.

With literary success came professional development. Zaynab Alkali took up an appointment at the University of Maiduguri which she held for twenty-two years before joining the Civil Service as a deputy director at NPHCDA, Abuja in 2000. Four years later, she moved to Nasarawa State University, Keffi, as a full professor of English. She would later become dean of the faculty of arts, and dean of the School of Post-Graduate Studies. Between 2005 and 2009 Zaynab Alkali served as deputy vice chancellor (Admin), briefly acting as a vice chancellor in 2006. Between 2015 and 2016, she occupied the post of director, gender studies.

Zaynab Alkali was honoured with the title of Icon of Hope (2000) by His Excellency, President Olusegun Obasanjo's government. She received the Nigerian Woman of Distinction Award ( 29 September 2010) on the occasion of Nigeria's Golden Jubilee, presented by His Excellency, President Goodluck Jonathan. The Adamawa State Governor, His Excellency Murtala Nyako, bestowed on her the Woman of Substance Merit Award,(  2 October 2011).  Most recently, she received  A Lifetime Achievement Award for her outstanding contributions to the Nigeria Literary Canon by His Execllency Nasir El-Rufai at the Kaduna Book and Arts Festival (KABAFEST) on September 5, 2018, a proud Fellow of both the British Council, UK, and Stiftung Kulfursfond, Germany, (1998).

Zaynab Alkali serves as the board chairman of the following; Zayba Educational Resources Development, Keffi, Capital Science Academy, Kuje- Abuja and the National Library of Nigeria (NLN) Abuja. She also serves as vice chairman, Planning and Implementation Committee of Midlands University. Chairman board of trustees, (NADI) NURALKALI  Development Initiative. Grand matron - Halimafactor Community Initiative – 20 November 2019 and most recently, Grand matron of the Effective Reading Campaign in Nigeria- November, 2019.

Zaynab Alkali has authored the following books,  The Stillborn, The Virtuous Woman, Cobwebs & Others, The Descendants, The Initiates and the most recently Invisible Borders,. Three of the six books have won prizes, The Stillborn- ANA prize for the Best novel of the year, The Virtuous Woman – Spectrum Award (1978–2002), Cobwebs & Other Stories – ANA Award.

Ever the Educator, Zaynab is the proprietress of Zyba Model Nursery and Primary School, Keffi. When she is not busy with public commitments, she can be found supervising the affairs of her school and managing Zyba farms. Zaynab Alkali is a shining example of what can be achieved with dedication and hard work. She has not only honed her talent, she continues to give the world excellent works that capture the complexities of ordinary human beings.

Zaynab Alkali currently lives in Keffi. She was married to late Professor Nur Alkali. The marriage is blessed with six children and several grand children.

Edited
Zaynab Alkali, Al Imfeld (eds.), Vultures in the Air: Voices from Northern Nigeria, Ibadan-Kaduna-Lagos: Spectrum Books, 1995,

Awards
Association of Nigerian Authors(ANA) Literary Prize, 1985

See also 
List of Hausa people

Bibliography 
Kabir, Hajara Muhammad,. Northern women development. [Nigeria]. ISBN 978-978-906-469-4. OCLC 890820657.

References

External links
Africanwriter.com
Ips.siu.edu
Sumaila Umaisha, "Zaynab Alkali chats with KASU students", 5 January 2011.
Jstor.org

1950 births
Living people
People from Borno State
Nigerian women novelists
20th-century Nigerian novelists
21st-century Nigerian novelists
20th-century Nigerian women writers
21st-century Nigerian women writers
Bayero University Kano alumni
Nigerian women academics